The 2015–16 Towson Tigers men's basketball team represented Towson University during the 2015–16 NCAA Division I men's basketball season. The Tigers, led by fifth year head coach Pat Skerry, played their home games at SECU Arena and were members of the Colonial Athletic Association. They finished the season 20–13, 11–7 in CAA play to finish in a three way tie for third place. They lost in the quarterfinals of the CAA tournament to CAA tournament. They were invited to the inaugural Vegas 16, which only had eight teams, where they lost in the quarterfinals to Oakland.

Previous season
The Tigers finished the season 12–20, 5–13 in CAA play to finish in ninth place. They were eliminated in the first round of the CAA tournament where they lost to Elon.

Departures

Incoming transfers

Recruiting

Roster

Schedule

|-
!colspan=9 style="background:#000000; color:#FFD600;"| Non-Conference Regular season

|-
!colspan=9 style="background:#000000; color:#FFD600;"| CAA Regular Season

|-
!colspan=9 style="background:#000000; color:#FFD600;"| CAA tournament

|-
!colspan=9 style="background:#000000; color:#FFD600;"| Vegas 16

See also
2015–16 Towson Tigers women's basketball team

References

Towson Tigers men's basketball seasons
Towson
Towson